Sharifa Davronova (born 27 September 2006) is an Uzbeki track and field athlete who won the triple jump at the  2022 World Athletics U20 Championships aged 15.

Career
Davronova won the 2022 World Athletics U20 Championships – Women's triple jump competition in Cali, Colombia aged 15 years old. Her jump of 14.04m was 66cm ahead of the second placed competitor and the world leading jump by an u20 female athlete anywhere in 2022. Davronova then went to the delayed 2021 Islamic Solidarity Games in Konya, Turkey held in 2022 due to the COVID-19 pandemic. On 11 August 2022 Davronova secured the gold medal in the women's triple jump with a jump of 14.30 meters in a +4.6 wind.

Personal life
Davronova was born in Samarkand. Her mother is Nasiba Hoshimova. She is coached by Muzaffar Karimov and has been training in athletics since she was 10 years old.

International competitions

References

External Links

 2006 births
Living people
World Athletics U20 Championships winners
Uzbekistani female triple jumpers
People from Samarkand
Islamic Solidarity Games medalists in athletics
21st-century Uzbekistani women